WSBZ (106.3 FM) is a commercial radio station broadcasting a smooth jazz format. Licensed to Miramar Beach, Florida, United States, the station serves the Ft Walton Beach metropolitan area.  The station is owned by Carter Broadcasting, Inc.

The studios and offices are on Bay Drive in Santa Rosa Beach, Florida and the transmitter is near Mack Bayou Road.

References

External links
WSBZ Official website

SBZ
Smooth jazz radio stations in the United States